This is a list of United States senators born outside the United States. It includes senators born in foreign countries (whether to American or foreign parents). The list also includes senators born in territories outside the United States that were later incorporated into the United States (except for those born in the British colonies and territories in North America (or in the temporarily independent former British colonies and territories in North America) that would go on to form the United States of America).

See also
List of current United States senators
List of U.S. state governors born outside the United States
Natural-born-citizen clause (United States)

Notes

References
Senators Born Outside the United States – United States Senate

American people by ethnic or national origin
Born outside the United States